Lazar Rosić (born 29 June 1993) is a Serbian football centre back currently playing for Emirati club Khor Fakkan.

He spent several years in Portugal, where he made over 100 Primeira Liga appearances for Braga, Nacional and Moreirense.

Club career
Born in Kragujevac, Rosić played for hometown club Radnički Kragujevac, Radnički Niš and Vojvodina in the Serbian SuperLiga. In June 2016, he moved to Braga of the Portuguese Primeira Liga for a fee of €750,000, on a five-year contract. 

Rosić made his Braga debut in the league opener on 14 August 2016, in a 1–0 win at rivals Vitória de Guimarães; he lined up with several other Serbs and Montenegrins. On 19 September, he scored his first goal, at the end of a 3–1 loss at reigning champions Benfica. He was sent off on 5 May 2017, in the 24th minute of a 2–1 defeat at Moreirense.

In December 2018, unused for the season Rosić was loaned to fellow league team Nacional, effective from New Year's Day. On his debut on 7 January, he was hospitalised following a challenge by Porto's Lucas França, but returned for the next game against Belenenses. In a season that ended with relegation, he was sent off on 6 April 2019 in a goalless home draw with Aves.

On 28 June 2019, Rosić signed a three-year deal for Moreirense, with Braga retaining half of his economic rights.

References

External links
 
 Lazar Rosić at Srbija Fudbal
 Lazar Rosić stats at utakmica.rs
 Lazar Rosić at ForaDeJogo

1993 births
Living people
Sportspeople from Kragujevac
Association football defenders
Serbian footballers
Serbian expatriate footballers
Serbian SuperLiga players
Primeira Liga players
UAE Pro League players
FK Radnički 1923 players
FK Radnički Niš players
FK Vojvodina players
S.C. Braga players
C.D. Nacional players
Moreirense F.C. players
Khor Fakkan Sports Club players
Expatriate footballers in Portugal
Expatriate footballers in the United Arab Emirates
Serbian expatriate sportspeople in Portugal
Serbian expatriate sportspeople in the United Arab Emirates